The Suicide Squad (Original Motion Picture Soundtrack) is the soundtrack album for the film of the same name. The album was released on August 6, 2021, by Troll Court Entertainment and WaterTower Music. The album features several songs from different artists, which were personally selected by the film's director James Gunn, whom has called the album his "curated mix tape". A single for the soundtrack called "Rain" by Jessie Reyez and Grandson was released on June 22 as part of the soundtrack. A separate film score album, titled The Suicide Squad (Score from the Original Picture Soundtrack), was also released by WaterTower Music on the same date with John Murphy as the composer, replacing Gunn's frequent collaborator Tyler Bates who was originally to be the film's composer. A single for Murphy's score "So This Is The Famous Suicide Squad", was made available on July 8.

Background 
Tyler Bates was originally pitched to be the film's composer, due to his frequent collaboration with director James Gunn. During pre-production, Bates wrote music for Gunn to use on set as he had previously done for Gunn on the Guardians of the Galaxy films. However he left for unknown reasons and in May 2020, British composer John Murphy replaced Bates. For the soundtrack, Gunn personally choose the songs that he would be introducing. Gunn picked up first was  "Folsom Prison Blues" by Johnny Cash as the first one. He also revealed that he also planned to use other songs, like “Modern Love” by David Bowie, but decided that they would not be used. He created a Spotify playlist containing several songs the he almost used in the film and named it "Not-In-The-Suicide-Squad playlist". Shortly prior to the film's release, Gunn revealed that he used the songs that better fit in a scene by commenting: "I write all of the songs into the screenplay, and then those songs we play on set as we do the scenes".

Track listing 
All music composed by John Murphy.

The Suicide Squad (Original Motion Picture Soundtrack) 

All the songs from the soundtrack are featured in the film. Also featured in the film was the song "People Who Died" by the Jim Carroll Band, but is not featured in the soundtrack. "What a Way to Die" by The Pleasure Seekers was considered to be used in the film at the opening credits sequence, but the song "People Who Died" was used instead. "Modern Love" by David Bowie, "Rusty Cage" by Johnny Cash, "Draw the Line" by Aerosmith and "Death on Two Legs" by Queen were also considered to be part of the film's soundtrack, but they were dropped. Other rejected songs were "Somos Sur" by Ana Tijoux & Shadia Mansour, "The Human Paradox" by Dynazty, "Resistiré" by Resistré México, "A Perfect Miracle" by Spiritualized, "Sometimes" by Kero Kero Bonito and "El Pueblo Unido Jamas Sera Vencido" by Inti-Illimani. "Dirty Work" by Steely Dan was featured in the trailer but not the movie itself. James Gunn shared a Spotify playlist with the name "Songs Not Used in The Suicide Squad" that features all the songs that were planned to be in the film but were eventually dropped.

Track listing

References

External links
 Official site (soundtrack)
 Official site (score)

2021 soundtrack albums
2020s film soundtrack albums
DC Extended Universe soundtracks
Film scores
Soundtrack
WaterTower Music soundtracks
Superhero film soundtracks